Nurjan Salkenuly Subhanberdin (born 29 November 1964) is a Kazakh businessman and banker. He was the founder and former chairman of Kazkommertsbank, one of Kazakhstan’s largest banks and is a partner in the investment company Meridian Capital together with former Kazakh Oil Minister Sauat Mynbayev and former Kazkommertsbank executives Yevgeniy Feld and Askar Alshinbayev.

Subkhanberdin is one of Kazakhstan’s richest oligarchs with a fortune estimated in the billions of dollars. In 2007, he was the 664 on Forbes World Billionnair list, with $1.5 billion earned in the banking industry.

Biography 
Subkhanberdin was born in Almaty, Kazakhstan on 29 November 1964.

He completed his education at Moscow State University from where he graduated with a degree in political economy in 1988. It is thought that he attended Moscow State University at the same time as Timur Kulibayev, who is married to the daughter of the former Kazakh President Nursultan Nazarbayev.

Subkhanberdin is married  and is reported to have 

In 2008, with six other Kazakh businessmen, he spent $100 million on a project to open the first British private school in Central Asia, Haileybury Almaty, to get a British education for his children.

In March 2011, he met with President Nursultan Nazarbayev to talk about the economy of Kazakhstan.

Subkhanberdin owns luxurious real estate properties including a mansion in London and two villas that extend onto a private island on the Côte d’Azur. He previously also owned two condos at the Mandarin Oriental Residences in New York City.

Subkhanberdin sold his stake in Kazkommertsbank and withdrew from the board of directors of Kazkommertsbank in 2015.

Almaty airport was a property of the Kazkommertsbank group of Nurzhan Subkhanberdin, the bank’s founder, and Mynbayev, and then progressively fell into the hands of the Kulibayev family.

Controversies

Ermūhamet Ertısbaev interview 
In 2004, when Interfax interviewed Ermūhamet Ertısbaev in November 2004, he referred Subkhanberdin as "Kazakh Khodorkovsky." Ertısbaev, speaking in favor of legislation that would limit the abilities of "various elite groups" to influence politics through lobbying, told Interfax that "in the transition period, in the post-Soviet area, any attempt from the oligarchs to influence... the president, the Parliament and the government can result in serious political cataclysms." Critics, such as reporters for Respublika, said the government's de-monopolization campaign would give Kazakhstanis a chance "to see how the government will put monopolists and their protectors from the head of state's inner circle in their place."

Meridian Capital controversy 
In November 2017 the Organized Crime and Corruption Reporting Project (OCCRP) published an investigation into Meridian Capital based on the Paradise Papers leak. According to the OCCRP findings, in 2006 Subkhanberdin was the largest single shareholder of Meridian Capital with a 25% stake.

The OCCRP investigation revealed that Meridian Capital had easy access to money from Kazkommertsbank and that “they used a large portion of deposits to fund project after project. This enabled them to grow quickly, and at little risk to themselves. According to an email from a central bank official, whenever a project failed, the bank owners and executives – who were also Meridian’s owners – would dump the losses onto the bank’s balance sheets.” This practice resulted in a large portfolio of non-performing loans that generated colossal losses for Kazkommertsbank, with the bank requiring a US$7.5 billion bailout from the Kazakh state in 2017.

In 2022 the New York Post published an article titled “How shady Kazakh cash is building NYC’s poshest pads” where it described how Meridian Capital invested its money into lavish real estate developments in Manhattan. The article quoted Jack Blum, a renowned money laundering and tax evasion expert and former US Senate staff attorney, questioning the legitimacy of Meridian Capital’s funds.

References

External links

Living people
1964 births
Kazakhstani businesspeople
Ethnic Kazakh people
Moscow State University alumni
Kazakhstani billionaires